The following is a list of cast members who have appeared in the MTV reality series Ex on the Beach.

Cast

Original series
Bold indicates original cast member; all other cast were brought into the series as an ex.

Celebrity series

  Ages at the time the cast member appeared in the series
 Key:  = "Cast member" returns to the beach for the second time.
 Key:  = "Cast member" returns to the beach for the third time.

References

Ex on the Beach
Cast members